This is a complete episode listing for the anime series The Vision of Escaflowne. The series premiered in Japan on TV Tokyo on April 2, 1996, completing its twenty-six episode run on September 24, 1996.

Episode listing

See also
 List of The Vision of Escaflowne characters

References
General

Specific

Episodes
Vision of Escaflowne